Wright-Humason School for the Deaf in New York City was a specialist school attended by Helen Keller from 1894 to 1896.

References

External links
 Hellen Keller's autobiography
 Class of 1895

Schools for the deaf in the United States
Defunct schools in New York City
Helen Keller